The Milledgeville Historic District, in Milledgeville in Baldwin County, Georgia, is a historic district which was listed on the National Register of Historic Places in 1972.

The district is approximately the size of the  area laid out in the 1803 plan for the city.

It includes Classical Revival and other architecture.

It includes at least two properties that are separately listed on the National Register:
Atkinson Hall, Georgia College, and
Old Governor's Mansion (1839), 120 South Clarke St.

Gallery

References

External links

Historic districts on the National Register of Historic Places in Georgia (U.S. state)
Neoclassical architecture in Georgia (U.S. state)
Geography of Baldwin County, Georgia
National Register of Historic Places in Baldwin County, Georgia